Roger Dubé (born 2 October 1965) is a Canadian-born French former ice hockey player. He competed in the men's tournament at the 1998 Winter Olympics.

References

External links

1965 births
Living people
Anglet Hormadi Élite players
Boxers de Bordeaux players
Brest Albatros Hockey players
Canadian ice hockey right wingers
Chicoutimi Saguenéens (QMJHL) players
French ice hockey right wingers
Gothiques d'Amiens players
Hull Olympiques players
Ice hockey people from Quebec
Ice hockey players at the 1998 Winter Olympics
Kassel Huskies players
LHC Les Lions players
Longueuil Chevaliers players
Olympic ice hockey players of France
People from Sept-Îles, Quebec
Quebec Remparts players
Saginaw Generals players
Salt Lake Golden Eagles (IHL) players
Trois-Rivières Draveurs players